The 1887 Cincinnati football team was an American football team that represented the University of Cincinnati as an independent during the 1887 college football season. The team compiled a 1–0 record. Henry Bettman was the team captain. The team had no head coach and played its home games at Union Ball Park in Cincinnati.

Schedule

References

Cincinnati
Cincinnati Bearcats football seasons
College football undefeated seasons
Cincinnati football